Friedrich Josef Maria Berentzen (11 September 1928 in Haselünne – 20 February 2009 in Bad Rothenfelde) was a German businessman known for the liquor manufacturer Berentzen, who was until 2005 family business. He is the inventor of apple flavor grain liquors and brought the Apfelkorn in 1976 as an independent product on the market.

References

External links
Berentzen Group

1928 births
2009 deaths
Businesspeople from Lower Saxony
Officers Crosses of the Order of Merit of the Federal Republic of Germany
People from Emsland